Slavko Vraneš (born 30 January 1983) is a Montenegrin former professional basketball player. He also represented the Montenegrin national basketball team in the international competitions.

Professional career
Vraneš started playing basketball in the Serbian club FMP Železnik. Still a junior, he was snapped up by the Turkish club Efes Pilsen for the 2000–01 season. Then he returned to his native country in January 2001, where he played for Budućnost Podgorica until the summer of 2003.

Vraneš was selected by the National Basketball Association's New York Knicks in the second round of the 2003 NBA Draft. He was waived by the Knicks in December 2003 before ever playing a game for them. In early January 2004, he signed a ten-day contract with Portland Trail Blazers. Before his contract expired, he played one game in the 2003–04 NBA season.

That one game for Portland ended up being Vraneš first and only game in the NBA. The game took place on January 8, 2004, in a 75–96 loss to the Minnesota Timberwolves where Vraneš played for 3 minutes and recorded 1 foul and no other stats.

After that, he played briefly for Crvena zvezda. From 2004 to 2007, he played with Budućnost Podgorica for the second time in his career. In October 2007, he signed a three-year contract with Partizan.

In October 2011, he signed with Sanaye Petroshimi BC in the Iranian Super League. During 2013, he played with Metalac Valjevo. In October 2013 he signed with Zob Ahan Isfahan.

On February 10, 2015, he re-signed with Metalac Valjevo. On May 8, he left Metalac Valjevo. Later that month, he returned to his former team Petrochimi Bandar Imam of Iran.

In November 2017, he signed with Metalac Valjevo.

See also
 List of European basketball players in the United States
 List of Montenegrin NBA players
 List of tallest players in National Basketball Association history

References

External links
 Slavko Vraneš at aba-liga.com
 Slavko Vraneš at eurobasket.com
 Slavko Vraneš at euroleague.net
 Slavko Vraneš at fiba.com
 Slavko Vraneš at Basketball-Reference.com

1983 births
Living people
ABA League players
Anadolu Efes S.K. players
Basketball League of Serbia players
BC UNICS players
Centers (basketball)
KK Budućnost players
KK Crvena zvezda players
KK FMP (1991–2011) players
KK Metalac Valjevo players
KK Partizan players
Montenegrin expatriate basketball people in Serbia
Montenegrin expatriate basketball people in the United States
Montenegrin men's basketball players
National Basketball Association players from Montenegro
New York Knicks draft picks
Petrochimi Bandar Imam BC players
Portland Trail Blazers players
Sportspeople from Pljevlja